Heureux may refer to:

Vessels:
French ship Heureux (1783), a ship of the French Navy in service from 1783 to 1798
HMS Heureux (1800), a ship of the French Navy captured by the British in 1800, lost at sea in 1806
French corvette Lynx (1804), a ship of the French Navy renamed HMS Heureux when captured by the British in 1807

Persons with the surname L'Heureux:
Claire L'Heureux-Dubé, Canadian Supreme Court justice
Philippe Lheureux, French author and conspiracy theorist